An interobject is a dream phenomenon of an object intermediate or in-between two other known objects.

Definition
The term was coined by Mark J. Blechner in his study The Dream Frontier. Interobjects differ from typical dream condensations in which two objects are fused into one. Instead the condensation is incomplete. Some examples from the literature on dreams include "a piece of hardware, something like the lock of a door or perhaps a pair of paint-frozen hinges," and "something between a record-player and a balance scale." Interobjects are new creations derived from partially fused blends of other objects.

The nature of interobjects

Interobjects, like disjunctive cognitions, which would seem bizarre if encountered waking life, are accepted by most people as commonplace in dreams. They have implications for both the theory of dreaming and the theory of categorization. Interobjects show the dreaming mind grouping items together whose connection may not be apparent to the waking mind. "Something between an aqueduct or a swimming-pool" reveals the category of "large man-made architectural objects that contain water." "Something between a cellphone and a baby" reveals a category combining a relatively new piece of technology and a live infant: both make noise when you don't expect it, both are held close to your body, and both can give you a feeling of connectedness.

Study
Scientists do not know if interobjects occur only in dreams or if they may occur as unconscious categorizations during waking life. Freud called interobjects "intermediate and composite structures." He thought they were inferior mental constructions and were scrupulously avoided in waking life.

Adults tend to regularize interobjects when recounting dreams in waking life. Children are better able to sustain interobjects in their original form. One boy described to his father a dream in which the former was in trouble at sea when a seal rescued his group "They thought it was just a seal, but [...] it was a whole boat." His father, less comfortable with ambiguity, responded that it was really a boat. "So really, it was a boat, a big, safe boat." The boy, holding fast to the integrity of the dream, responded that it was both. This child had not yet learned to regularize his perceptions to fit the way the world works. Adults may learn to reject interobjects in waking life, but still retain them in their dreams.

Possible explanations 
Interobjects may have an elementary function in human thought. By transgressing the normal mental categories described by Eleanor Rosch, interobjects may be the origin of new ideas that would be harder to come by using only fully formed, secondary process formations. They may be one example of "Oneiric Darwinism" in which new thought-mutations are created during dream-life and rejected or retained in waking life depending on their usefulness.

Jung
held that if the dreamer walked about and acted like a person awake, we would have the clinical picture of schizophrenia.  Hobson  concluded that dreams are more like delirium than schizophrenia.  Both Jung and Hobson focus on how dreams are defective forms of normal waking life, but in dreams, our minds are in some ways able to function better than in waking life.  Interobjects show the ability of the dreaming mind to notice how things that are very different nevertheless have features in common. The mind then creates a new category, which we might never have noticed in our waking life.  The woman who dreamed of a "cellphone-baby" was creating a new category: small objects that are held close to the body and that make noise at surprising and embarrassing times.

Interobjects have been used in advertising. A set of rules, known as a "Replacement template," enabled a computer to create interobjects:

Notes

Dream
Cognition
Psychoanalytic theory